Yamaha Motor Pakistan  is a Pakistani motorcycle assembler which is a wholly-owned subsidiary of Japanese company Yamaha Motor Company. It is based in Karachi, Pakistan.

History
The company has invested  to set up a plant at Port Qasim, Karachi, Pakistan. In 2015, the plant was inaugurated.

Operations in Pakistan 
In 2022, Yamaha Motors announced that it had developed a new electric motor prototype that promises high output and efficiency. The prototype, which was unveiled at the 47th Tokyo Motor Show, is said to be capable of producing an output of 350 kW and has an efficiency rating of 96%. 

According to Yamaha Motors, the motor was developed using advanced technology and features a unique design that allows for maximum output with minimal energy loss. However, the launch of this new electric motor was accompanied by a price hike due to heavy taxation, which impacted the sales of Yamaha Motors in the short term. This latest development, along with the price hike, marked a significant milestone for Yamaha Motors, which had been striving to improve the performance of its electric motors while balancing the cost of production with the demands of the market.

Motorcycles
Yamaha Motor Pakistan has launched only four models in Pakistan which share almost the same engine but with some differences in their design.
YBR125
YBR125G
YB125Z
YB125Z-DX

See also
 Automotive industry in Pakistan

References

Yamaha
 Pakistani subsidiaries of foreign companies
 Manufacturing companies based in Karachi
 Vehicle manufacturing companies established in 2013
 2013 establishments in Pakistan
Privately held companies of Pakistan